Yukon Brewing is a trademark owned by the Chilkoot Brewing Co. Ltd brewery in Whitehorse, Yukon, Canada.

When entering the American market, Chilkoot Brewing Company Ltd. faced trademark issues and decided to call itself the Cheechako Brewing Company. In 1999, however, the name changed again to Yukon Brewing Company. In February 2010 the Company portion of the name was dropped. The brewery is now known as Yukon Brewing.
In September 2009 Yukon Red, the brewery's Amber Ale was awarded the 2009 Canadian Beer of the Year at the Canadian Brewing Awards, finishing with gold in the Amber Ale category.

In 2009 regulatory changes in Yukon where the brewery is based allowed for distilling. Yukon Brewing distilled and barreled what became a single malt whiskey. The whiskey is marketed under the brand name Two Brewers.

Yukon Gold is the best selling draft beer in Yukon.

References

External links
 Official site

Beer brewing companies based in Yukon
Companies based in Whitehorse
Cuisine of Yukon